Ubolratana Narinaga, Princess Argavoraraja Kalya, born Princess Bua Ladavalya (28 November 1846 – 15 October 1901) was a consort of Chulalongkorn, the King of Siam.

She was a daughter of Ladavalya, Prince Bhumindra Bhakdi and Lady Chin.

Ancestors

References 

Thai princesses consort
19th-century Thai women
19th-century Chakri dynasty
20th-century Thai women
20th-century Chakri dynasty
Thai female Phra Ong Chao
People from Bangkok
1846 births
1901 deaths
Thai female Mom Chao